Oakland School or Oaklands School may refer to:

South Africa
 Oaklands Secondary School in the Western Cape province of South Africa

United Kingdom 
 Oaklands School, a community secondary school located in Bethnal Green, London, England
 Oaklands Community School, a mixed comprehensive school in west Southampton, Hampshire, England
 Danegrove Primary School, formerly called Oakland School, a primary school in East Barnet, London, England

United States

California 
 Oakland Technical High School, Oakland Tech, or just simply "Tech", is a public high school in Oakland, California
 Oakland School for the Arts, a charter school in Oakland, California
 Oakland Unified School District, a public education school district in Oakland, California

Elsewhere 
 Oaklands Catholic School, a Catholic voluntary (Aided) comprehensive coeducational school, Waterlooville, Hampshire
 Oakland Mills High School, Columbia, Maryland
 Oakland Christian School, a private pre-kindergarten–12  school in Auburn Hills, Michigan
 Oakland Public Schools, a comprehensive community public school district, Bergen County, New Jersey
 Oakland Catholic High School, a private, Roman Catholic college preparatory girls school, Pittsburgh, Pennsylvania
 Oakland School (Virginia), a coeducational boarding and day school in Keswick, Virginia
 Oakland Alternative High School, an alternative secondary school in Tacoma, Washington

See also

 Oakland High School (disambiguation)
 Oakland (disambiguation)
 Oaklands (disambiguation)